Unaka may refer to:

Unaka High School, a public high school located northeast of Elizabethton, Tennessee
Unaka National Forest, formerly in North Carolina, Tennessee and Virginia
Unaka Range, a mountain range on the border of Tennessee and North Carolina